Wicko  (German Vietzig) is a village in Lębork County, Pomeranian Voivodeship, in northern Poland. It is the seat of the gmina (administrative district) called Gmina Wicko.

Before 1945 the area of Farther Pomerania, where the village is located, was part of Germany. For details of the history of the region, see History of Pomerania.

The village has a population of 690.

References

Villages in Lębork County